Normandie-Maine Regional Natural Park (Fr.: Parc naturel régional Normandie-Maine) is a protected area of forest and bocage located in the French regions of Normandy and Pays de la Loire.

Geography

The park encompasses the Sarthe river valley and the large Forest of Andaines.

Member communes

 Aillières-Beauvoir • Ambrières-les-Vallées • Antoigny • Assé-le-Boisne • Aunay-les-Bois • Avrilly •
 Bagnoles-de-l'Orne • Barenton • La Baroche-sous-Lucé • Beaulandais • Beauvain • La Bellière • Bion • Boitron • Le Bouillon • Boulay-les-Ifs • Bourg-le-Roi • Bursard •
 Carrouges • Ceaucé • Le Cercueil • Chahains • Le Champ-de-la-Pierre • Champfrémont • Champsecret • La Chapelle-d'Andaine • La Chapelle-près-Sées • La Chaux • Ciral • Colombiers • La Coulonche • Coulonges-sur-Sarthe • Couptrain • Couterne • Crissé •
 Domfront • Dompierre •
 Essay •
 La Ferrière-Béchet • La Ferrière-Bochard • La Ferrière-aux-Étangs • La Ferté-Macé • Fontenai-les-Louvets • Forges • Francheville • La Fresnaye-sur-Chédouet •
 Gandelain • Geneslay • Ger • Gesvres •
 Haleine • La Haute-Chapelle • Hauterive • Héloup • Le Housseau-Brétignolles •
 Joué-du-Bois • Juvigny-sous-Andaine •
 Lalacelle • Laleu • La Lande-de-Goult • Lassay-les-Châteaux • Le Grez • Lignières-Orgères • Livaie • Livet-en-Saosnois • Longuenoë • Lonlay-l'Abbaye • Loré • Louzes • Lucé •
 Magny-le-Désert • Marchemaisons • Méhoudin • Le Mêle-sur-Sarthe • Le Ménil-Broût • Ménil-Erreux • Le Ménil-Scelleur • Mieuxcé • Mont-Saint-Jean • La Motte-Fouquet •  Moulins-le-Carbonnel •
 Neufchâtel-en-Saosnois • Neuilly-le-Bisson • Neuilly-le-Vendin •
 Pacé • La Pallu • Perrou • Pezé-le-Robert • Pré-en-Pail •
 Radon • Ravigny • Rennes-en-Grenouilles • La Roche-Mabile • Rouellé • Rouessé-Vassé • Rouperroux •
 Saint-Aubin-d'Appenai • Saint-Brice • Saint-Calais-du-Désert • Saint-Céneri-le-Gérei • Saint-Christophe-le-Jajolet • Saint-Cyr-en-Pail • Saint-Denis-de-Villenette • Saint-Denis-sur-Sarthon • Saint-Didier-sous-Écouves • Saint-Ellier-les-Bois • Saint-Fraimbault • Saint-Georges-de-Rouelley • Saint-Georges-le-Gaultier • Saint-Gervais-du-Perron • Saint-Gilles-des-Marais • Saint-Hilaire-la-Gérard • Saint-Jean-du-Corail • Saint-Julien-sur-Sarthe • Saint-Léger-sur-Sarthe • Saint-Léonard-des-Bois • Saint-Martin-des-Landes • Saint-Martin-l'Aiguillon • Saint-Maurice-du-Désert • Saint-Michel-des-Andaines • Saint-Nicolas-des-Bois • Saint-Ouen-le-Brisoult • Saint-Patrice-du-Désert • Saint-Paul-le-Gaultier • Saint-Pierre-des-Nids • Saint-Pierre-sur-Orthe • Saint-Rémy-de-Sillé • Saint-Rémy-du-Val • Saint-Rigomer-des-Bois • Saint-Samson • Saint-Sauveur-de-Carrouges • Sainte-Marguerite-de-Carrouges • Sainte-Marie-du-Bois • Sainte-Marie-la-Robert • La Sauvagère • Sées • Sept-Forges • Sillé-le-Guillaume • Sougé-le-Ganelon •
 Tanville • Tessé-Froulay • Thubœuf • Torchamp •
 Les Ventes-de-Bourse • Villaines-la-Carelle • Villepail • Vimarcé • Vingt-Hanaps • Vrigny •

See also
 List of regional natural parks of France

References

External links
 Normandie-Maine PNR Activities Report (2010) 
 Regional Natural Parks: French Government Tourist Office 

Regional natural parks of France
Geography of Orne
Geography of Manche
Geography of Mayenne
Geography of Sarthe
Protected areas established in 1975
Tourist attractions in Manche
Tourist attractions in Orne
Tourist attractions in Mayenne
Tourist attractions in Sarthe